Steve Oelrich is an American law enforcement officer and former Republican member of the Florida Senate from 2006 to 2012, where he represented the 14th District, which included Alachua, Bradford, Columbia, Gilchrist, Levy, Marion, Putnam, and Union counties.

Early life, education, and early law enforcement career
Oelrich graduated from St. Petersburg College in 1968 with an A.A. in Police Administration and a B.S. in Criminology with a certificate in law enforcement from Florida State University. He also attended Pinellas County Police Academy, Florida Department of Law Enforcement (FDLE) Special Agent's School, FDLE Homicide Investigation School, National Sheriffs' Institute, The 29th Session of the FBI National Academy Executive Development Program and the FDLE Chief Executive Institute.

Alachua County Sheriff
Steve Oelrich's 14-year command at the Alachua County Sheriff's Office was filled with many accomplishments that brought the agency into the modern world of crime fighting. He was elected as the first Republican Sheriff in Alachua County since Reconstruction.

Some of these accomplishments include:

Brought a grant writer on board in the search for available monies that could be used to upgrade many of the agencies outdated systems. By the end of FY 98, the influx of grant monies totaled nearly $2.5 million. With it, he was able to completely upgrade the agency's computer systems, add a computerized ―paperless, warrants management program, start the agency's website and Starlink bulletin board, implement community-based substations and expand the K-9 unit with the purchase of an explosives detecting K-9.
Instrumental in the formation and organization of a statewide Hostage Negotiators Association and he participated locally in the implementation of "Partnerships for a Productive Community" FOCUS groups.
Partnered with WCJB TV 20 and Crime Stoppers to run a weekly broadcast showing North Central Florida's Most Wanted fugitives' faces as well as their crimes, and with the local papers.  The Most Wanted program was, and is today, highly successful at removing criminals from the streets.
Instituted a career development program for deputy sheriff employees, along with a new performance appraisal system to fairly evaluate employees for advancement.
Led the acquisition of a new county jail and a new administration building.
Under Sheriff Oelrich, The Alachua County Sheriff's Office achieved accreditation with three major accrediting bodies: (1)The Commission for Florida Law Enforcement Accreditation (CFA), (2) Florida Corrections Accreditation Commission, and (3) the Public Safety Communications Accreditation.

While Sheriff, Oelrich was in charge of then Sheriff's deputy and future Congressional candidate Jake Rush, who challenged Ted Yoho for his seat in 2014.

Florida Senate

Elections
In 2006, when incumbent Democratic State Senator Rod Smith opted to run for Governor rather than seek another term in the Senate, an open seat was created. Then-Sheriff Oelrich opted to run for the seat, and defeated Travis Horn in the Republican primary. In the general election, Oelrich faced off against State Representative Edward L. Jennings, whom he defeated by almost 10,000 votes, picking up a seat for the Republicans.

Oelrich sought re-election to a second term in 2010, and was challenged by former State Representative Perry McGriff, who had previously run for the seat in 2006, but had lost to Jennings in the Democratic primary. Oelrich slightly improved on his performance from four years earlier, and defeated McGriff.

Committee assignments
As a freshman Senator, Oelrich was appointed as Chairman of the Senate Higher Education Committee.  He served also as Vice Chairman of the Military Affairs and Domestic Security Committee and as a member of the Policy and Steering Committee on Governmental Operations, as well as the Commerce Committee, the Communications, Energy, and Public Utilities Committee and the General Government Appropriations Committee.  He was also a member of the Joint Legislative Committee on Everglades Oversight and the Senate Select Committee on Florida's Inland Waters.

Currently, Senator Oelrich continues to serve as Chair of the Higher Education Committee, is Vice Chair of the Environmental Preservation and Conservation Committee, and serves additionally on the committees of Banking and Insurance, Ethics and Elections, Higher Education Appropriations, and Health and Human Services Appropriations.

Congressional campaign

In 2012, Florida Senate districts were reconfigured, and rather than run for a third term in the newly created 7th District, Oelrich instead announced in January 2012 that he would run against incumbent Republican United States Congressman Cliff Stearns in the redrawn 3rd district. Oelrich was not alone in challenging Stearns; veterinarian Ted Yoho and Clay County Clerk of Court Jimmy Jett also ran. In an upset, Yoho managed to unseat Stearns, though Oelrich and Jett placed a distant third and fourth, respectively.

Personal life 
Steve Oelrich was most recently married to Cynthia Jones Steinemann. Rose Mary Treadway  from 1994 until 2012 ending in divorce. He has three sons, one deceased, Nick.  His oldest son, Ivan, is a local businessman in Gainesville; his youngest, Kenneth, is currently a student at Jacksonville University after serving in active duty in Iraq as a Sergeant in the U.S. Marine Corps. Marriage ending with wife  number 2 Susan Colby Oelrich ending 1993, First marriage Nancy J. Oelrich ending 1979. Four marriages, three divorces.

Nick Oelrich "Gift of Life" Golf Classic
The purpose of the "Gift of Life" foundation is to promote organ and tissue donation. The yearly event is named after Oelrich's son, Nick, an organ and tissue donor, who saved or enhanced the lives of one hundred and eight people.  Each year, the Nick Oelrich "Gift of Life" Golf Classic enables us to remember Nick Oelrich and the great contribution of life he made.

References

External links 
 Project Vote Smart - Senator Steve Oelrich (FL) profile
 Follow the Money - Steve Oelrich
 2006 campaign contributions

Republican Party Florida state senators
1945 births
Living people
Florida State University alumni